The Milwaukee Road Depot in Oconomowoc, Wisconsin is a railroad depot built in 1896 and operated by the Chicago, Milwaukee, St. Paul and Pacific Railroad. It is a one-story hip-roofed building clad in split granite. The station served the Twin Cities Hiawatha from its formation in 1935 to its discontinuation in 1971, and now operates as Maxim's Restaurant. On display outside is a railway platform and Northern Pacific Railway 1923, a passenger car that operated on the Kettle Moraine Scenic Railway which was later renovated and painted red. The Canadian Pacific Railway's single-tracked Watertown Subdivision remains next to the depot.

The depot was listed on the National Register of Historic Places in 1980 and on the State Register of Historic Places in 1989.

References

External links 
 Maxim's Restaurant

Railway stations on the National Register of Historic Places in Wisconsin
Commercial buildings on the National Register of Historic Places in Wisconsin
National Register of Historic Places in Waukesha County, Wisconsin
Former railway stations in Wisconsin
Charles Sumner Frost buildings
Victorian architecture in Wisconsin
Railway stations in the United States opened in 1896
Oconomowoc